is a 1976 novel, written by Japanese author Ryū Murakami, that features a portrait of narrator Ryū and his friends trapped in a cycle of sex, drugs and rock 'n roll during the 1970s.

Plot
Narrated by the main character Ryū, the novel focuses on his small group of young friends in the mid-1970s. Living in a Japanese town with an American air force base, their lives revolve around sex, drugs and rock 'n roll.

The near-plotless story weaves a vividly raw, image-intensive journey through the daily monotony of drug-induced hallucinations, vicious acts of violence, overdoses, suicide, and group sex.

Characters 
 Ryū – Narrator. 19-year-old bisexual substance abuser.
 Lilly – Ryū's prostitute friend and casual sex partner.
 Reiko – Okinawan friend of Ryū and girlfriend of Okinawa.
 Okinawa – drug-addicted Okinawan friend of Ryū and boyfriend of Reiko.
 Yoshiyama – Unemployed junkie friend of Ryū and abusive boyfriend of Kei.
 Kei – Friend of Ryū and girlfriend of Yoshiyama.
 Kazuo – Male friend of Ryū.
 Moko – Substance abuser friend of Ryū.
 Jackson – African American Airman at the local AFB, he arranges for group sex escapades between his base comrades and Ryū's group.

Reception and legacy
Murakami submitted the novel to the literary magazine Gunzo debutant contest, in which it won the first prize. It also won the prestigious Akutagawa Prize the same year. The title of rock band Luna Sea's song , off their 1991 self-titled debut album, is a reference to the novel.

Film adaptation
26-year-old Murakami made his directorial debut with a film adaptation of his novel Almost Transparent Blue, which he also scripted, in 1979 and Toho distributed the film in 1980. Hidenori Taga and Kei Ijisato under Kitty Records produced the film, starring Kunihiko Mitamura (Ryu), Mari Nakayama (Lilly), Haruhiko Saitô (Yoshiyama), Keiko Wakasa (Kei), Narumi Tokura (Reiko), Yuri Takase (Moko), Goro Masaki (Kazuo), Togo Igawa (Okinawa) and Akiko Nakamura (Mari).

English-language editions
 Ryū Murakami, Almost Transparent Blue (Kagirinaku tōmei ni chikai burū), translated by Nancy Andrew, 1st hardback ed., Tokyo ; New York : Kodansha International : Distributed by Kodansha International/USA through Harper & Row, 1977, 126 pages. Tokyo ; New York : Kodansha International : Distributed by Kodansha International/USA through Harper & Row, 1977, 126 p. 
 Ryū Murakami, Almost Transparent Blue, translated by Nancy Andrew, 1st paperback ed., Tokyo; New York : Kodansha International, 1981 (reissue, 1992), 126 p. 
 Ryū Murakami, Almost Transparent Blue, translated by Nancy Andrew, 1st trade paperback ed., New York : Kodansha America, 2003, 128 p.

References

External links
Extensive review by author Tao Lin at Thought Catalog
Short J-pop.com review

1976 Japanese novels
Japanese-language novels
Postmodern novels
Existentialist novels
Novels by Ryū Murakami
Novels set in Japan
Japanese novels adapted into films
Akutagawa Prize-winning works